"Licence to Kill" is a song by American singer Gladys Knight, written and recorded for the James Bond film Licence to Kill, also from 1989. It was written by Narada Michael Walden, Jeffrey Cohen and Walter Afanasieff. Released as a single on May 30, 1989, the song became a top-ten hit in the United Kingdom, peaking at number six and becoming Knight's last charting solo single there. The song charted well in Europe, peaking atop the Swedish Singles Chart for eight weeks (four chart periods at the time) and reaching the top five in seven other European countries. It also peaked at number 79 on Canada's RPM Top Singles chart but did not appear on the US Billboard Hot 100.

Critical reception
Jerry Smith from Music Week wrote, "Gladys Knight beats all-comers for the dubious pleasure of singing the theme to the latest Bond movie, written and produced by Narada Michael Walden, and basically a pastiche of the best of the previous themes. It can't really fail." Pat Sharp for Smash Hits felt "Licence to Kill" "sounds very dramatic and James Bond-y".

Track listings
 7-inch single
A. "Licence to Kill" – 4:11
B. "Pam" (performed by Michael Kamen and the National Philharmonic Orchestra)

 12-inch single
A1. "Licence to Kill" (extended version)
B1. "Pam" (performed by Michael Kamen and the National Philharmonic Orchestra)
B2. "Licence to Kill"

Personnel
 Gladys Knight: vocals
 Narada Michael Walden: songwriter, producer, arranger
 Walter Afanasieff: songwriter, associate producer, arranger, orchestrator, keyboards, drum programming, percussion, Moog bass, synthesizer
 Jeffrey Cohen: songwriter
 Michael Kamen: orchestrator
 Gary Grant, Jerry Hey: horns
 Greg "Gigi" Gonaway: Paiste cymbals
 Ren Klyce: Fairlight synthesizer programming
 Claytoven Richardson, Jeanie Tracy, Karen "Kitty Beethoven" Brewington, Melisa Kary, Sandy Griffith, Skyler Jett: background vocals

Charts

Weekly charts

Year-end charts

Cover versions
In 2017, musician and producer Fernando Perdomo collaborated with former Pink Floyd backing vocalist and Blue Pearl lead singer, Durga McBroom, recording the song for the multi-artist compilation album, Songs, Bond Songs: The Music of 007.

References

External links
 Gladys Knight - Licence To Kill on Discogs

1989 singles
1989 songs
Gladys Knight songs
Licence to Kill
MCA Records singles
Number-one singles in Sweden
Song recordings produced by Narada Michael Walden
Song recordings produced by Walter Afanasieff
Songs from James Bond films
Songs written by Narada Michael Walden
Songs written by Walter Afanasieff
Songs written for films